Ambika Anand (born 15 September 1980) is an Indian TV anchor and fashion consultant at NDTV. She has previously anchored shows like Eyes on Style, Band Baajaa Bride Season 7, Big Fat Indian Wedding, I'm Too Sexy For My Shoes, and I'm Too Sexy – All Access. And host ' The Ambika Anand Show ' on her Youtube channel

Early life and career

Born in Chandigarh, she is daughter of Mr. Anil P Anand and Mrs. Jayshree Anand, she completed her schooling from Delhi Public School & graduated from Jesus and Mary College, Delhi University. She earned a Diploma Degree in Economics from the Cardiff Business School.

Anand joined NDTV on 8 December 2002 and worked for their show India Business Report, a weekly programme that was produced for the BBC. After close to two years of working with NDTV, she went and worked for the Department of Communication of the International Labour Organization in Geneva.

In December 2005, she rejoined NDTV and worked on several programmes in her capacity as reporter and anchor, including Hot Property, Boss's Day Out and Value for Money. She also anchored live business news on the channel.

Anand turned to fashion and wedding related programming in 2007 and joined NDTV's lifestyle channel, Good Times. She worked on a series of hit programs like Big Fat Indian Wedding, 10 Things To Do Before You Say Bye, Vanity No Apologies, The Inside Story and I Am Too Sexy For My Shoes.

Continuing with her foray in this genre, she began anchoring a new show Band Baja Bride in 2011, a bride makeover show where she performed the part of mentor. She also hosted The Fast and the Gorgeous, a reality show, in the same year.

Awards and honours
 Was on Verves India's best dressed list in 2009, 2010 
 Her show I'm Too Sexy For My Shoes also won the Best Lifestyle & Fashion Show for 2010 at the Indian Telly Awards
 Awarded Cosmopolitan India's Fun Fearless Female TV Personality Award 2011
 10 Things to do before you say Bye! - London - A show that Anand was a part of, won the award for Outstanding Broadcast Feature at VisitBritain Media Awards 2011
 Band Baajaa Bride, a show that Anand hosted won Best Lifestyle Show at the Indian Telly Awards 2011 
 Was on the list of HT City Delhi's Most Stylish 2013 
 In 2019, The Colombo Fashion Week show was sent as an entry by NDTV 24x7 for Best Fashion And Lifestyle Show for Indian Television Awards 2019 and  won in that category. Ambika had scripted and anchored the show!

YouTube
In 2019, She started her own youtube channel. And launched " The Ambika Anand Show "

References

External links

Indian women television presenters
Indian television presenters
1980 births
Living people
People from Delhi
NDTV Group
Delhi University alumni
Indian bloggers
Alumni of Cardiff University
Delhi Public School alumni
Indian women bloggers